A community association is a nongovernmental association of participating members of a community, such as a neighborhood, village, condominium, cooperative, or group of homeowners or property owners in a delineated geographic area. Participation may be voluntary, require a specific residency, or require participation in an intentional community. Community associations may serve as social clubs, community promotional groups, service organizations, youth sports group, community gardens, or quasi-governmental groups.

Types
Community land trust
Community garden
Community-supported agriculture
Homeowners' association – association of property owners within a community
Neighborhood association- voluntary association of property owners or residents in a neighborhood
Intentional community – may or may not include formal association or governance
Neighborhood watch
Social club

See also
Community Associations Institute
Neighborhood council

External links
 Community Associations Network

Neighborhood associations
Community development
Community organizations
Local government
Civil society